Na Bema is the current  Cokossian monarch of northern Togo.

See also
Politics of Togo

References

Living people
Togolese royalty
Year of birth missing (living people)
Place of birth missing (living people)
20th-century Togolese people